The General Directorate of Military Counterintelligence is the military counterintelligence agency of Venezuela, whose function is to prevent intelligence or espionage internally and externally by military and civilians.

History
The agency originates from the Armed Forces Intelligence Services (SIFA), which was signed into service on 30 August 1957.

In 1974,  the agency changed its name to the Directorate of Military Intelligence (DIM). On 16 May 1977, the military organization changed its name to the Directorate General of Military Intelligence Sector (DGSIM) and then later changed the name of Directorate General of Military Intelligence (DGIM). Under these names, their operations functioned as military intelligence for the Venezuelan military. 

On 21 July 2011, the organization changed its name to the Directorate General of Military Counterintelligence (DGCIM), whose function is no longer military intelligence but counterintelligence.

See also
 Law enforcement in Venezuela
 Dirección de los Servicios de Inteligencia y Prevención (Directorate of Intelligence and Prevention Services, DISIP)
 General Counterintelligence Office

References

Secret police
Venezuelan intelligence agencies
Military of Venezuela
Military intelligence agencies